James Clifford Veatch (December 19, 1819 – December 22, 1895) was a lawyer who served as an Indiana state legislator and county auditor.  He later served as a Union general during the American Civil War, fighting primarily in the Western Theater. He rose to command of a division of infantry and fought in several important battles.

Early life and career
Veatch was born near Elizabeth, Indiana, in 1819. His father Isaac Veatch was a member of the Indiana House of Representatives from 1827 to 1828. He died of cholera in July 1833. His grandfather Nathan Veatch fought in the American Revolution at the Battle of King's Mountain as a lieutenant of Tennessee Volunteers. His great-grandfather James Veatch fought, was wounded, and died of his wounds in the American Revolution at the Battle of Camden.

James Veatch was educated in common schools and under private tutors. He studied law and was admitted to the bar, establishing a private practice in Elizabethtown. He practiced for many years, and was the auditor of Spencer County, Indiana, from 1841 until 1855. He was serving as a state legislator when the Civil War began.

Civil War service
Veatch volunteered for service in the Union army and was appointed colonel of the 25th Regiment Indiana Infantry.  He led the regiment at the battle of Fort Donelson and then took command of the 2nd Brigade in Stephen A. Hurlbut's division at the battle of Shiloh.  Major John W. Foster noted that "Colonel Veatch acted with great courage. He was always with his brigade in the thickest of the fight."

On April 28, 1862, Veatch was appointed brigadier general of volunteers.  He was still in command of his brigade during the siege of Corinth and the battle of Hatchie's Bridge where he was wounded.  For the next year General Veatch commanded the District of Memphis.  Veatch led the 4th Division of the XVI Corps during the Meridian Expedition.  His division joined William T. Sherman's forces for the Atlanta Campaign and fought at the battles of Resaca, Dallas and Kennesaw Mountain.  He went on sick leave on July 17, 1864, just prior to the Battle of Atlanta.  When Veatch returned to active duty his former commander, Oliver O. Howard, instructed him to wait in Memphis for orders.  He briefly commanded the District of West Tennessee before being assigned to the Department of the Gulf.  There he assumed command of the 1st Division in Gordon Granger's XIII Corps and participated in the Battle of Fort Blakely.  He was brevetted to major general of volunteers in March 1865 and resigned from the army in August of that year.

Following is the report of the 1st Division's action during the Alabama Campaign and the Battle of Fort Blakely as submitted by General Veatch:
HDQRS. FIRST DIVISION, THIRTEENTH ARMY CORPS,
April 13, 1865
CAPTAIN: In compliance with instructions received from headquarters Thirteenth Army Corps, I have the honor to submit the following report of the march and operations of this command since leaving Navy Cove:
On the afternoon of March 18, 1865, marched four miles through deep sand of the Gulf beach; course, east southeast; camped at 6 p.m. for the night. Sunday, March 19, 1865, reveille at 5 a.m.; marched at 6 a.m.; marched twelve miles; course, east-northeast; crossed Shell Bank Bay about 11 a.m.; camped at 4 p.m. Monday, March 20, reveille at 5 a.m.; marched at 6 a.m.; marched eight miles; found the road impassable; retraced the route for the distance of four miles; camped for the night at 4 p.m. Tuesday, March 21, reveille at 5 a.m., but owing to the roads being impassable the command did not break camp, details of 1,200 men being sent forward to build corduroy roads; raining all day. Wednesday, March 22, reveille at 4 a.m. marched at 5 a.m.; crossed Mud Creek at 6.15 a.am., marching over three miles of corduroy made the preceding day and night, making five miles, the rear of the column making only three miles and a half. Thursday, March 23, struck tents at 5 a.m.; marched at 6 a.m.; made corduroy all day; went into camp at 2 p.m.; details making corduroy all night; marched one mile. Friday, March 24, left camp at 5 a.m.; marched thirteen miles; course northwest; crossed East Branch of Fish River at 10 a.m.; crossed the Main Branch of Fish River at 1.30 p.m. Command went into camp one mile west of the crossing, on the road leading to Deer Park, at 2.45 p. m. General Slack, commanding First Brigade, which was the rear guard, reported his train had been attacked by a small party of rebel cavalry. Lost 8 men prisoners and 14 mules. Saturday, March 25, marched at 12.15 p.m.; course northwest; marched seven miles and a half; camped at 5 p.m. Sunday, March 26, marched at 6.30 a.m., crossing both branches of D'Olive's Creek, First Brigade, General Slack commanding, in advance, Twenty first Iowa Infantry being advance guard. About 12 m. skirmish line advanced. At 2 p.m. met enemy about one mile and a half from Spanish Fort. Slight skirmishing until 5 p.m., when the skirmish line was advanced. At 6.30 p.m. sharp and rapid firing in front of Twenty-first Iowa. Enemy's line driven into the fort. Twenty-first Iowa lost 1 killed and 2 wounded, the skirmish line and reserves being halted until morning. At 3 a.m. on Monday, March 27, the enemy advanced a strong skirmish line, which was promptly driven back. The entire command under arms at daylight on the morning of the 27th. General Benton, commanding Third Division, moved up on our right. The enemy skirmished into their fortifications, and then closed up. Loss in First Division, 2 killed and 156 wounded. Tuesday, March 28. The evening of yesterday the command engaged in throwing up rifle-pits, and making slow advances upon the line of the enemy. Heavy skirmish firing all day. Seventh Massachusetts Battery went into position on the left of General Benton's line. A great amount of artillery firing. One man killed and 4 wounded. The command holding two brigades front in column of regiments with strong skirmish line from each brigade. Second Brigade in reserve. Second Brigade relieved the First Brigade during the night. Wednesday, March 29, heavy firing on skirmishing line and by enemy's artillery. Large details from the command building batteries during the day and night. Four men killed and 9 men wounded in Twenty-ninth Illinois Infantry by a shell; 2 men wounded in Second Brigade. At 12 midnight enemy made a sortie along the whole front of my line, but were handsomely repulsed. An advance of the whole skirmish line was made, upon the enemy retiring, of about 100 yards. Thursday, March 30, heavy skirmish firing about daylight, and was continued until 8 a.m. Captain James T. Reed, of my staff, slightly wounded in leg by pieces of spent shell. At 3 p.m. received orders to withdraw my command from the line of investment and report to Major-General Canby for orders, who directed me to take charge of a supply train of quartermaster's and commissary of subsistence stores, and proceed to Holyoke, for the purpose of communicating with and supplying Major-General Steele's command. Proceeded about two miles on the Holyoke road and camped for the night. Five men wounded during the day. Friday, March 31, marched at 8 a.m., with train of seventy-five wagons loaded with supplies. Arrived at Holyoke at 12 m.; entrenched, encamped to await General Steele's arrival.
Saturday, April 1, Major McEntee, of General Steele's staff, came up from General Canby's headquarters with dispatch and an escort of cavalry. Lieutenant-Colonel Thornburgh, Fourth Tennessee Cavalry, with a command of about 1,000 men, reported to me, by order of Major-General Canby, who remained until 3 p.m., and then moved out for the purpose of attempting to make a connection and to communicate with the forces of Major-General Steele. At 6 p.m. heard firing in the direction of Blakely; sent forward a squadron of cavalry, which was in camp as an advance guard; immediately followed it with two regiments of infantry and a section of artillery. Marched about three miles, and everything becoming quiet, and the night becoming very dark, I returned to camp, which point I reached at 9 p.m. Sunday, April 2, at 6 a.m. received information of a party of rebel scouts. Sent out a party to capture them, who returned at 9 a.m. without being successful. The cavalry force of Colonel Thornburgh returned at 11 a.m. without hearing anything of General Steele. One battalion was sent at once with wagon train to Starke's Landing for supplies. The balance was sent by two different roads to meet General Steele's command. At 12 m. heard General Steele's command were investing Blakely. At 3 p.m. General Steele's train came for the supplies. At the same time the train sent at 11 a.m. to Starke's Landing returned empty, by order of Major-General Canby. Monday, April 3, at midnight received an order from General Canby to immediately march to the support of General Steele at Blakely. At 1 o'clock the entire column, with trains, &c., was in motion. Crossed the bridge at Sibley's Mills just before daylight. Reported to General Steele, and was ordered to take position to the left of General Andrews' division in line of investment. At 3 p.m. was relieved by General Garrard's division. Moved back from front and went into camp as a reserve. Tuesday, April 4, remained in camp until 9 p.m., when the Second Brigade was sent to the front to occupy a vacancy in the line between the line of Brigadier General C. C. Andrews and Brigadier-General Garrard. Wednesday, April 5, nothing of any importance transpired during the day. At 9 p.m. the Third Brigade moved up to the support of General Hawkins' division. Thursday, April 6, the First Brigade relieved the Second Brigade in the rifle-pits; 1 man, Company C, Eighth Illinois wounded. Friday, April 7, the Second Brigade was engaged during the day in manufacturing gabions. The Thirtieth Missouri, of the Third Brigade, was similarly engaged in manufacturing them for General Hawkins' command. The Twenty-third Wisconsin Infantry was engaged in building a battery in front of General Hawkins' command. One man of the Forty-sixth Illinois Infantry wounded. Twenty-third Wisconsin, 1 killed and 4 wounded. Two wounded in Ninety-ninth Illinois Infantry. Saturday, April 8, no casualties. Considerable skirmishing along our entire front. Sunday, April 9, skirmishing during the entire day. At 5.30 a charge was made along the entire line, the charge being a complete success. The Second Brigade of this division was engaged, and was among the first in the enemy's lines. They captured a large quantity of ordnance and ordnance stores. Monday, April 10, received orders at 12.30 a.m. to withdraw forces from the enemy's works, and prepare to move at daylight. Marched at 8 a.m., and marched two and a half miles and camped. Remained in camp all day. Tuesday, April 11, remained in camp all day until 6 p.m.; marched to Starke's Landing, a distance of thirteen miles. Wednesday, April 12, embarked on transports for Mobile. Made a landing five miles below the city at 10 a.m. Moved into the city at once. Found the city evacuated, the enemy having left the night before.
JAMES C. VEATCH,
Brigadier-General, Commanding.
Captain F. W. EMERY,
Assistant Adjutant-General.

Postbellum career
After the war, Veatch became the Indiana Adjutant General in 1869, and was active in local veterans and fraternal organizations, including the Grand Army of the Republic and the Freemasons. He was the collector of internal revenue taxes from April 1870 until August 1883.

James C. Veatch died December 22, 1895, in Rockport, Indiana and was buried at Sunset Hill Cemetery.
He was survived by three children, and the youngest generation Veatch is now in college at Iowa State University.

Notes

References
 Indiana Civil War Biographies
Eicher, John H., and Eicher, David J., Civil War High Commands, Stanford University Press, 2001, .
Attribution

Adjutants General of Indiana
County auditors in the United States
Union Army generals
People of Indiana in the American Civil War
People from Harrison County, Indiana
Indiana lawyers
Members of the Indiana House of Representatives
1819 births
1895 deaths
People from Rockport, Indiana
19th-century American politicians
19th-century American lawyers
19th-century American businesspeople